is a Japanese media franchise that was originally announced in 2003 by the title Neppu Kairiku Bushi Lord as a collaboration between the companies Gainax, Takara and Broccoli. After the death of story creator Sunao Yoshida in 2004 and the departure of other staff members, the project was put on indefinite hiatus, but was eventually restarted by Bushiroad in March 2013 with Bushiroad's president Takaaki Kidani as executive producer.

A 90-minute-long anime aired as part of a 3-hour special on December 31, 2013, a collaboration between Bushiroad, Bandai Visual, Nitroplus and Kinema Citrus. The anime used  by Masatoshi Ono as ending theme music.

The franchise is part of Bushiroad's new trading card game Five Qross, alongside Fantasista Doll and Infinite Stratos. A manga series was serialized in Jive's shōnen manga magazine Comic Rush from December 2004 to July 2007. A spin-off manga series titled Neppu Kairiku Bushi Road Side: Suou began serialization in Bushiroad's Bushiroad Monthly magazine from October 2013.

Plot
The story takes place in a time when the world is in the pits of despair after being ravaged by a poison called "shinobi" that came to earth via an asteroid. The people ran away to the place called "Kairiku," a place that used to be the bottom of the ocean. Here, the people try and protect themselves against the effects of the poison. In such a world, there was a single light of hope. The "Holy Weapon Giga Road" and the legendary warrior "Yagyuu" are needed in order to counter the effects of the poison. Ame, a princess of a fallen nation, stands up in order to save the world.

Characters

A former princess/priestess of the country Ise.
Her mother is dead because of a shinobi. She travels with companions and a key to finding a weapon built by men who put an end to the shinobi. She has romantic feelings for Suou. In the last part of the movie, Suou is the one who survives the battle between the Tsukuyomi and cries at the end.

He is a Yagyuu, the last of its kind. On the verge of death, he meets Ame who saves him and he decides to follow her. He has romantic feelings for Ame.

A swordsman working under Ame.

A scholar from Ise, who was supposedly dead, but is alive for a mysterious reason. He became the leader of the shinobis.

The young leader of the country Tōra.

A female officer working under Shin.

A male officer working under Shin.

Reception

References

External links
Official website 

 

Bandai Namco franchises
Bandai Visual
Bushiroad
Kinema Citrus
Nitroplus
Orange (animation studio)
Shōnen manga